The Portrait of Lucrezia Panciatichi is an oil on panel painting by the Italian artist Agnolo di Cosimo, known as Bronzino, finished around 1545. It is housed in the Uffizi Gallery in Florence, Italy.

Lucrezia di Sigismondo Pucci was the wife of Bartolomeo Panciatichi, a Florentine humanist and politician, also portrayed by Bronzino in another Uffizi portrait. Giorgio Vasari  describes the two portraits as: "so natural that they seem truly living". The show of refined garments and jewelry was intended not only to underline the élite position of the woman, but also aspects of her personality through a complex symbology, including the words "Amour dure sans fin" on the golden necklace, a reference to a love treatise written for the Grand Duke of Florence, Cosimo I de' Medici, in 1547.

The portrait is mentioned and described in the novel The Wings of the Dove (1902) by Henry James. The portrait is also alluded in the Victorian ghost story “Amour Dure” by Vernon Lee.

This portrait is often mistaken for that of Elizabeth Báthory.

See also
Portrait of Bartolomeo Panciatichi

References

External links

Panciatichi, Lucrezia
Panciatichi, Lucrezia
1545 paintings
Panciatichi, Lucrezia
Panciatichi, Lucrezia
Panciatichi, Lucrezia
Paintings by Bronzino in the Uffizi
Books in art